Carabus creutzeri is a species of ground beetle. It is found in Central and Southern Europe: Austria, Switzerland, Slovenia, Croatia, and Italy.

References

External links

creutzeri
Beetles of Europe
Beetles described in 1801
Taxa named by Johan Christian Fabricius